Abbot Boniface Sauer, O.S.B. (10 January 1877 – 7 February 1950) was a Benedictine monk and Roman Catholic bishop who served as apostolic administrator of Hamheung, Korea and Abbot of Tokugen o Tokwon.

Biography
Boniface Sauer was born Oberuffhausen, Germany. On 4 February 1900, he made Solemn Profession in the Order of Saint Benedict and was ordained a priest on 26 July 1903.
On 25 August 1920, Sauer was appointed vicar apostolic of Wonsan, Korea and Titular Bishop of Appiaria. He was ordained a bishop on 1 May 1921 by Bishop Gustave-Charles-Marie Mutel, M.E.P.

On 9 July 1928, Sauer was appointed the apostolic administrator of Ilan, China. Six years later, on 15 February 1934, he resigned as apostolic administrator of Ilan, China.

On 12 January 1940, Sauer was appointed the abbot of Tokugen o Tokwon, Korea and apostolic administrator of Hamheung, Korea.

See also

 Religion in Korea
 Religion in North Korea
 Christianity in Korea
 Catholic Church in South Korea
 List of Catholic Dioceses in Korea
 List of Saints from Asia

References 

 
North Korea
1950 deaths